Ramil Guliyev (born 29 May 1990) is an Azerbaijani-born Turkish sprinter. He competes in the 100 metres and 200 metres. At the 2017 World Championships, Guliyev became the World Champion in the 200 metres, winning Turkey's first ever gold medal in the World Championships. His club is Fenerbahçe Athletics. In 2018, he won the gold medal in the 200 metres at the European Championships.

Career
He competed at the 2009 European Athletics Junior Championships, winning a silver medal in the 100 m and a gold medal in the 200 m.
He also competed in Berlin at the 2009 World Championships in Athletics, finishing seventh at the  age of 19 when Usain Bolt set his world record at 200m.

He holds the national and national junior records in both events. He is also the 200 m European junior record holder and national junior record holder in the 60 metres. His 200 m time is the second fastest by a junior athlete, after Usain Bolt's 19.93 sec. He came second in the men's European Athletics Rising Star of the Year Award for his achievements in 2009.

Move to Turkey
In April 2011, the IAAF enacted a transfer delay in line with its international rules, banning Guliyev from representing any country other than Azerbaijan until April 2014. The runner argued that the training and financial support that he received in Turkey was significant, and that the people, language, and culture were very similar between the two countries, though his home federation remained open to him representing Azerbaijan internationally again. Following negotiations with the Azerbaijani Ministry of Youth and Sports, Guliyev confirmed his original decision not to compete for Azerbaijan. Azerbaijan's Minister of Youth and Sports Azad Rahimov explained this by Guliyev's putting forward too unreasonable financial demands for a young athlete and expressed doubt that Guliyev's representation of Turkey in the 2012 Summer Olympics would be successful.

On September 8, 2015, he ran the 200 metres race, part of the Hanžeković Memorial in Zagreb timed in 19.88. At the time that ranked him tied for the 34th best performer of all time and #6 for 2015.

On August 10, 2017, he won the men's 200 metre race at the London 2017 IAAF World Championship in a time of 20.09.

After his historic success he stated that "if not for Fenerbahçe, I would have probably quit athletics a long time ago. All my achievements are thanks to my club."

He won the gold medal at the 2018 European Championships with a time 19.76 s, setting the new championships record.

Coach
His first coach was Tofig Aliyev until 2009.
Guliyev's second coach was Eldar Guliyev.
He was trained by his father until the latter's death from a heart attack in June 2010.

Statistics

Personal bests

All information from IAAF profile.

International competitions

1Representing Europe

2Did not finish in the final

Circuit wins

200 m
IAAF Diamond League
Stockholm: 2018
Paris: 2017
Birmingham: 2017
Oslo: 2018
Doha: 2019

4 × 100 m relay
IAAF Diamond League
Stockholm: 2016

World Rankings 

Guiliyev was ranked among the best in the world in the 200 m sprint event in 2009 and in the period 2015 to 2019, according to the votes of the experts of Track and Field News.

Representing Azerbaijan:

Representing Turkey:

References

External links

1990 births
Living people
Sportspeople from Baku
Athletes (track and field) at the 2008 Summer Olympics
Athletes (track and field) at the 2016 Summer Olympics
Olympic athletes of Azerbaijan
Azerbaijani male sprinters
Turkish people of Azerbaijani descent
Naturalized citizens of Turkey
Turkish male sprinters
Fenerbahçe athletes
Azerbaijani emigrants to Turkey
World Athletics Championships athletes for Azerbaijan
World Athletics Championships athletes for Turkey
European Athletics Championships medalists
Olympic athletes of Turkey
Mediterranean Games silver medalists for Turkey
Athletes (track and field) at the 2013 Mediterranean Games
Universiade medalists in athletics (track and field)
World Athletics Championships medalists
Athletes (track and field) at the 2018 Mediterranean Games
Athletes (track and field) at the 2022 Mediterranean Games
Mediterranean Games gold medalists for Turkey
Mediterranean Games medalists in athletics
Universiade gold medalists for Azerbaijan
Universiade bronze medalists for Turkey
European Athletics Championships winners
World Athletics Championships winners
Mediterranean Games gold medalists in athletics
Medalists at the 2015 Summer Universiade
Medalists at the 2009 Summer Universiade
Islamic Solidarity Games competitors for Turkey
Islamic Solidarity Games medalists in athletics
Athletes (track and field) at the 2020 Summer Olympics
Olympic male sprinters